The 1998 Dutch Figure Skating Championships took place between 3 and 4 January 1998 in Tilburg. Skaters competed in the disciplines of men's singles and ladies' singles.

Senior results

Men

Ladies

External links
 results

Dutch Figure Skating Championships
Dutch Figure Skating Championships, 1998
1998 in Dutch sport